Thomas Blount or Blunt (born ca. 1604) was a British soldier, Member of Parliament and inventor.

Life
He was born in Wricklesmarsh, in Charlton, Kent, the second son of Edward Blount of the Middle Temple and his second wife, Fortune, daughter of Sir William Garway. Blount was educated at Brasenose College, Oxford where he matriculated in 1623. He was admitted to Grays Inn in 1624.

He was present at the meetings of Royalist country gentlemen at Maidstone, which resulted in the getting up the Kentish petition of March 1642, and turned informer, giving an account of the proceedings in evidence at the bar of the House of Commons. He was a colonel in the Parliamentary Army during the Civil War. On the Restoration of the monarchy he was imprisoned but subsequently released. He represented Kent as an MP in the Barebones Parliament of 1653.

He was a highly ingenious man and knew many of the Fellows of the Royal Society. He was himself admitted as a Fellow in February 1665 but resigned in 1668.

He constructed with his own hands a carriage with an improved action, "for the ease of both man and horse", which attracted considerable attention at the time, and is often mentioned by Samuel Pepys. Both Pepys and his contemporary diarist John Evelyn tell us of the colonel's experiments and inventions at his stately seat at Charlton: his vineyard, the wine of which was "good for little", new-invented ploughs, and subterranean warren. He was among the first to fit a way-wiser, or odometer, to a carriage.

References

People from Charlton, London
English inventors
Fellows of the Royal Society
English MPs 1653 (Barebones)
Alumni of Brasenose College, Oxford
Members of Gray's Inn
1600s births
Year of death missing
Roundheads
Place of birth missing